Henry Ernest Fowler, 2nd Viscount Wolverhampton (4 April 1870–9 March 1943) was a peer in the peerage of the United Kingdom.

Fowler was the only son and heir of Henry Hartley Fowler, 1st Viscount Wolverhampton and Ellen Thorneycroft. He was educated at Charterhouse and Christ Church, Oxford. He was a Wesleyan Methodist.

Fowler married Evelyn Henrietta Wrottesley, daughter of Arthur Wrottesley, 3rd Baron Wrottesley  on 8 June 1910. She died in 1947.

Fowler succeeded to the title Viscount Wolverhampton, on the death of his father, 25 February 1911,  The title had been created in 1908. The title became extinct on his death, without issue, on 9 March 1943.

Arms

References

External links
Henry Ernest Fowler, 2nd Viscount Wolverhampton (1870-1943), National Portrait Gallery

Wolverhampton
Wolverhampton
Wolverhampton
People from Wolverhampton
People educated at Charterhouse School
Alumni of Christ Church, Oxford
Methodist Church of Great Britain people